Mauriel Carty (born 29 May 1997) is a male Anguillan sprinter. He competed in the 200 metres event at the 2015 World Championships in Athletics in Beijing, China. His parents are Maureen and Dave Carty, who both run a famous BBQ restaurant in West End, Anguilla. He trained under Mr.Duncan while living in Anguilla. He went to Alwyn Allison Richardson Primary School and Albena Lake Hodge Comprehensive School. He has moved to America and now lives in Brooklyn, New York and attends college at Kingsborough Community College.

See also
 Anguilla at the 2015 World Championships in Athletics

References

External links

Anguillan male sprinters
Living people
1997 births
World Athletics Championships athletes for Anguilla
Athletes (track and field) at the 2018 Commonwealth Games
People from The Valley, Anguilla
Commonwealth Games competitors for Anguilla